Pomare is a residential neighbourhood of Lower Hutt, in the Wellington Region of New Zealand's North Island. It comprises the northern part of the suburb of Taitā, and includes the Pomare Railway Station and Pomare School.

The suburb is named after either Māui Pōmare (Ngāti Mutunga), who served as Minister of Health from 1923 to 1926, or an early Māori chief in the area. Pomare Railway Station opened in 1954. State housing in the area has been redeveloped by Housing New Zealand since 2011 after years of social neglect and gang problems.

Education
There is one primary school in the area. Pomare School is a state contributing primary (years 1 to 6) school with  students as of

References

Suburbs of Lower Hutt